One Side of the Water is a 1988 Taiwanese television drama series produced by Ping Hsin-tao, based on the 1975 film The Unforgettable Character and its associated 1976 novel, both written by his wife Chiung Yao. The series stars Chiung Yao regulars Chin Han (who portrayed a different character in the 1975 film) and Leanne Liu in the leading roles.

Plot
The story is set in the 1980s, instead of the 1970s as in The Unforgettable Character. When Chu Chih-keng brings orphaned girl Tu Hsiao-shuang to his family, everyone welcomes her with open arms—except Chu Chih-keng's wife Lee Hsin-pei, since only she knows that Chu Chih-keng has loved Tu Hsiao-shuang's late mother Kao Hsu-pai. Chu Chih-keng's son Chu Shih-yao takes an immediate interest in the hard-working, forbearing and considerate Tu Hsiao-shuang, and Tu Hsiao-shuang also develops feelings for him. The problem is Chu Shih-yao is too hesitant to break up with the sweet Tso Chiao-jou who is crazy about him. In fact Chu Shih-yao has never loved Tso Chiao-jou romantically, rather he treats her like a younger sister, because the Chus and Tsos have been close for several decades. He and Tso Chiao-jou are involved in an accident: he becomes crippled for life while she suffers a major head injury. Meanwhile, Lee Hsin-pei blames everything on Tu Hsiao-shuang and drives her out.

Given Tso Chiao-jou's severe injury, Tu Hsiao-shuang and Chu Shih-yao both realize their romance is forbidden, so Tu Hsiao-shuang marries the aspiring writer Lu Yu-wen while Chu Shih-yao marries the aphasic Tso Chiao-jou. Despite their bet efforts, their marriages prove much more difficult than they have ever imagined. Chu Shih-yao's marriage falls apart when Tso Chiao-jou realizes that he still loves Tu Hsiao-shuang, while Lu Yu-wen's immaturity, tantrums, and gambling habits also destroy his union with Tu Hsiao-shuang.

Cast
Leanne Liu as Tu Hsiao-shuang, the female protagonist

Chu family
Jin Chao-chun as Chu Chih-keng, the breadwinner of the family
Tang Chi as Chu Chih-keng's mother
Lee Lee-fong as Lee Hsin-pei, Chu Chih-keng's wife
Chin Han as Chu Shih-yao, Chu Chih-keng's oldest child
Liu Fang-ying as Chu Shih-ching, Chu Chih-keng's second child
Chao Yung-hsin as Chu Shih-hui, Chu Chih-keng's youngest child

Tso family
Fan Hung-hsuan as Tso Ssu-hsien, the breadwinner of the family
Ma Hui-chen as Lin Ya-hung, Tso Ssu-hsien's wife
Lee Tien-chu as Tso Yu-nung, Tso Ssu-hsien's oldest child
Hsu Kuei-ying as Tso Chiao-jou, Tso Ssu-hsien's second child
Lee Kuo-chao as Tso Chao-nan, Tso Ssu-hsien's youngest child

Others
Ku Yin as Kao Hsu-pai, Tu Hsiao-shuang's mother
Liang Fu-lung as Lee Chien, Chu Shih-ching's boyfriend
Lin Tzay-peir as Lu Yu-wen, Tso Yu-nung's pal
Hsu Nai-lin as Lei Hsing-chien, Tso Chiao-jou's speech therapist
Tsou Lin-lin as Yang Man-ling, a girl who befriends Tso Chao-nan
Lee Yu-lin as Liao Chi-feng, Lu Yu-wen's former roommate
Tu Ching-yi as Pin-pin, Tu Hsiao-shuang's daughter (last 2 episodes)
Lee Pi-hua as herself (singer)

Soundtrack

Lee Pi-hua actually appears as herself in episodes 19–21 singing Track 3, which was the theme song of The Unforgettable Character (in the film it was sung by Chiang Lei and Frankie Kao respectively).

Reception
The drama's ratings were not as good as expected, in part because of Chiang Ching-kuo's sudden death in January 1988.

References

1988 Taiwanese television series debuts
1988 Taiwanese television series endings
Mandarin-language television shows
Television shows set in Taiwan
Taiwanese romance television series
Chinese Television System original programming
Television shows based on works by Chiung Yao